"Gimme" is a song by American singer and songwriter Banks from her third studio album, III (2019). It was released as the album's lead single on April 29, 2019, and debuted on Zane Lowe's Beats 1 radio show. The electro-R&B song was written by Banks and Josiah Sherman and produced by Hudson Mohawke, Kito, and BJ Burton.

Composition
"Gimme" is a "heavily electronic" pop and electro-R&B song that was written by Banks and Josiah Sherman and produced by Hudson Mohawke, Kito, and BJ Burton. It was written in the key of D minor, "Gimme" has a tempo of 120 beats per minute. The song's production is made of funky beats and ethereal vocals with an aggressive distorted track, bouncing keyboards and pitched vocals. According to Banks, "Gimme" is about getting what you want. It’s about knowing what you deserve, saying it out loud, and demanding it with no apologies.

Music video
The music video for "Gimme" was directed by Matty Peacock and published on May 23, 2019, on Banks' Vevo channel. The video begins with Banks alone in the dark with a multicolored laser light that pulsates to the song's melody in a pyramid form. She starts playing a choreography while one beam is pointing directly downwards. Eventually she is joined by other dancers as the light starts growing more numerous.

Credits and personnel
Credits adapted from the liner notes of III.

Recording
 Engineered at The Healthfarm, Westlake Recording Studios (West Hollywood, California) and Panther Palace (Burbank, California)
 Mixed at Conway Recording Studios (Los Angeles, California) and Electric Lady Studios (New York City, New York)
 Mastered at HM Mastering (Minneapolis, Minnesota)

Personnel

 Banks – vocals
 Hudson Mohawke – production, engineering, synthesizers, drum programming
 Kito – co-production
 BJ Burton – additional production, engineering, drum programming, synthesizers, arrangement
 Ross Birchard – engineering
 Buddy Ross – engineering
 Tom Elmhirst – mixing
 Brandon Bost – engineering for mix
 Huntley Miller – mastering

Charts

Release history

References

2019 singles
2019 songs
Banks (singer) songs
Harvest Records singles
Songs written by Banks (singer)